is a Japanese comedian and actor. He performs boke (he can also perform Kire Gei or tsukkomi) in the comedy duo Unjash with his partner Ken Watabe.

Kojima's most well known gag is the mispronunciation or mistake of his last name "Kojima", as he is frequently called other names on purpose such as "Ooshima" for comedic effects. He would then loudly respond to the mistake with "I'm Kojima!" as a part of the gag.

Discography

Singles

Filmography

Variety
Current appearances

One-off/irregular appearances

Former appearances

TV dramas

Films

Animated films

Internet drama

Radio

Internet

Advertisements

Music videos

Live

References

Notes

Sources

External links
 
 
Unjash Kojima no Mahjong Site: Kojimajan 

Japanese comedians
Japanese male actors
Mahjong players
Comedians from Tokyo
People from Hachiōji, Tokyo
1972 births
Living people